Anne-Mette van Dijk (née Anne Mette Bille; born 22 April 1968) is a Danish former top badminton player of mid '90s. Anne Mette Bille won her first title in 1980 at the Danish U13 Junior Individual Championships. In 1986, she won Nordic Junior Championships partnering Thomas Lund. In 1989 she won the senior national doubles title for the first time with Lotte Olsen. In 1993 she reached the quarter-finals at the World Championships. 1994, she won silver at the European Championship in the mixed team event. Her husband Jeroen van Dijk was a former Olympian in Badminton. They met each other in 1994 in Taiwan & got married in 1999. She runs a shop for greeting cards for various occasions in Lyngby.

Achievements

IBF World Grand Prix 
The World Badminton Grand Prix sanctioned by International Badminton Federation (IBF) since 1983.

Women's doubles

Mixed doubles

IBF International 
Women's doubles

Mixed doubles

References 

1968 births
Living people
Danish female badminton players